The 2022–23 St. Lawrence Saints Men's ice hockey season was the 83rd season of play for the program and the 62nd in the ECAC Hockey conference. The Saints represented the St. Lawrence University and were coached by Brent Brekke, in his fourth season.

Season
Due to expected heavy snowfall in the Buffalo area, the game against Niagara was moved from November 19 to January 5.

Departures

Recruiting

Roster
As of September 19, 2022.

Standings

Schedule and results

|-
!colspan=12 style=";" | Regular Season

|-
!colspan=12 style=";" |

Scoring statistics

Goaltending statistics

Rankings

References

2022-23
St. Lawrence Saints
St. Lawrence Saints
St. Lawrence Saints
St. Lawrence Saints